This list of the prehistoric life of Massachusetts contains the various prehistoric life-forms whose fossilized remains have been reported from within the US state of Massachusetts.

Precambrian
The Paleobiology Database records no known occurrences of Precambrian fossils in Massachusetts.

Paleozoic
  †Agraulos – report made of unidentified related form or using admittedly obsolete nomenclature
 †Agraulos quadrangularis
 †Aldanella
 †Aldanella attleborensis
 †Allatheca – report made of unidentified related form or using admittedly obsolete nomenclature
 †Allatheca degeeri – broadly construed
 †Anabarites
 †Anabarites korobovi
 †Bemella
 †Bemella bella
 †Braintreella
 †Braintreella rogersi
 †Calodiscus
 †Calodiscus lobatus
 †Camenella
 †Camenella baltica – tentative report
  †Chancelloria
 †Coleoloides
 †Coleoloides typicalis
 †Condylopyge
 †Conotheca
 †Conotheca subcurvata
 †Dawsonia
 †Dawsonia dawsoni – or unidentified comparable form
 †Dipharus
 †Dipharus attleborensis
 †Dromopus – tentative report
 †Dromopus woodworthi – type locality for species
 †Eccentrotheca
 †Eccentrotheca kanesia
 †Fomitchella
 †Fomitchella infundabiliformis
 †Gracilitheca
 †Gracilitheca bayonet
  †Halkieria
 †Hyolithellus
 †Hyolithellus micans – or unidentified related form
 †Hyolithes
 †Hyolithes tenuistriatus – broadly construed
 †Kingaspis
 †Kingaspis avalonensis
 †Ladatheca – report made of unidentified related form or using admittedly obsolete nomenclature
 †Ladatheca cylindrica
 †Lapworthella
 †Lapworthella laudvigseni
 †Lapworthella ludvigseni
 †Leptostega
 †Leptostega abrupta
 †Linguella
 †Linguella viridis
 †Mellopegma – tentative report
  †Microdictyon
  †Obolella
 †Obolella atlantica
 †Obolus
 †Obolus parvulus – tentative report
 †Onchocephalites
 †Onchocephalites permingeati
  †Paradoxides
 †Paradoxides harlani
 †Pelagiella
 †Plinthokonion
 †Plinthokonion arethion
 †Rhombocorniculum
 †Rhombocorniculum cancellatum
  †Scenella
 †Scenella reticulata
 †Serrodiscus
 †Serrodiscus bellimarginatus
 †Sokolovitheca
 †Sokolovitheca sokolovi
 †Stenotheca – report made of unidentified related form or using admittedly obsolete nomenclature
 †Stenotheca acutacosta
 †Sunnaginia
 †Sunnaginia imbricata
  †Torellella
 †Torellella laevigata
 †Watsonella
 †Watsonella crosbyi

Mesozoic
This list of the Mesozoic life of Massachusetts contains the various prehistoric life-forms whose fossilized remains have been reported from within the US state of Massachusetts and are between 252.17 and 66 million years of age.

A

 †Acanthichnus
 †Acanthichnus aguineus – type locality for species
 †Acanthichnus alternans – type locality for species
 †Acanthichnus cursorius
 †Acanthichnus saltatorius
 †Acanthichnus trilinearis
 †Acteonella
 †Aenigmichnus
 †Aenigmichnus multiformis
 †Amblonyx – type locality for genus
 †Amblonyx giganteus – type locality for species
 †Amblonyx lyellianus
 †Amblypus – type locality for genus
 †Amblypus dextratus – type locality for species
 †Ammopus – type locality for genus
 †Ammopus marshi – type locality for species
 †Ampelichnus
 †Ampelichnus sulcatus
 †Anchisauripus
 †Anchisauripus exsertus – type locality for species
 †Anchisauripus hitchcocki – type locality for species
 †Anchisauripus minusculum – type locality for species
 †Anchisauripus minusculus
 †Anchisauripus parallelus
 †Anchisauripus sillimani
 †Anchisauripus tuberosus – type locality for species
   †Anchisaurus – type locality for genus
 †Anchisaurus polyzelus – type locality for species
 †Ancyropus
 †Ancyropus heteroclitus
 †Anomoepus
 †Anomoepus crassus
 †Anomoepus cuneatus – type locality for species
 †Anomoepus curvatus – type locality for species
 †Anomoepus gracillimus – type locality for species
 †Anomoepus intermedius – type locality for species
 †Anomoepus isodactylus – type locality for species
 †Anomoepus major – type locality for species
 †Anomoepus minimus – type locality for species
 †Anomoepus scambus – type locality for species
 †Anticheiropus – type locality for genus
 †Anticheiropus hamatus – type locality for species
 †Anticheiropus pilulatus – type locality for species
 †Antipus
 †Antipus bifidus – type locality for species
 †Apatichnus – type locality for genus
 †Apatichnus circumagens – type locality for species
 †Arachnichnus
 †Arachnichnus dehiscens – type locality for species
 †Argoides
 †Argoides macrodactylus
 †Argoides minimus – type locality for species
 †Argoides redfieldianum – tentative report
 †Argoides redfieldii – type locality for species

B

  †Batrachoides
 †Batrachoides nidificans
 †Batrachopus – type locality for genus
 †Batrachopus bellus – type locality for species
 †Batrachopus deweyi – type locality for species
 †Batrachopus dispar – type locality for species
 †Batrachopus gracilis – type locality for species
 †Batrachopus vuigaris
 †Bifurculipes
 †Bifurculipes curvatus
 †Bifurculipes elachistotatus
 †Bifurculipes laqueatus
 †Bifurculipes scolopendroideus
 †Bisulcus
 †Bisulcus undulatus – type locality for species
 †Brontozoum
 †Brontozoum approximatum
 †Brontozoum divaricatum – type locality for species
 †Brontozoum giganteum – type locality for species
 †Brontozoum isodactylum
 †Brontozoum parallelum – type locality for species
 †Brontozoum sillimanium
 †Brontozoum tuberatum – type locality for species

C

 †Chalthropteris
 †Clathropteris
 †Climacodichnus
 †Climacodichnus corrigatus – type locality for species
 †Cochlichnus
 †Cochlichnus anguineus
 †Conopsoides
 †Conopsoides curtus – type locality for species
 †Conopsoides larvalis
 †Copeza
 †Copeza archimedea
 †Copeza cruscularis
 †Copeza propinquata
 †Copeza punctata
 †Copeza triremus
 †Corvipes – type locality for genus
 †Corvipes lacertoideus – type locality for species
 †Cunichnoides – type locality for genus
 †Cunichnoides marsupialoideus – type locality for species
 †Cunicularius
 †Cunicularius retrahens

E

  †Eubrontes
 †Eubrontes divaricatus
 †Eupalamopus – type locality for genus
 †Eupalamopus dananus – type locality for species

G

 †Gigandipus – type locality for genus
 †Gigandipus caudatus – type locality for species
  †Grallator – type locality for genus
 †Grallator cuneatus – type locality for species
 †Grallator cursorius – type locality for species
 †Grallator formosus – type locality for species
 †Grallator gracilis – type locality for species
 †Grallator magnificus – type locality for species
 †Grallator parallelus – type locality for species
 †Grallator sillimaniium – tentative report
 †Grallator tenuis – type locality for species
 †Grammepus
 †Grammepus erismatus
 †Grammepus uniordinatus
 †Grammichnus
 †Grammichnus alpha

H

 †Halysichnus
 †Halysichnus laqueatus
 †Harpagopus
 †Harpagopus dubius
 †Harpedactylus
 †Harpedactylus crassus – type locality for species
 †Harpedactylus gracilior – type locality for species
 †Harpedactylus tenuissimus – type locality for species
 †Harpepus
 †Harpepus capillaris
 †Helcura
 †Helcura anguinea – type locality for species
 †Helcura littoralis – type locality for species
 †Helcura surgens – type locality for species
 †Henrisporites
 †Henrisporites angustus – type locality for species
 †Herpystezoum
 †Herpystezoum intermedius
 †Herpystezoum marshi
 †Herpystezoum minutus
 †Hexapodichnus
 †Hexapodichnus horreus
 †Hexapodichnus magnus
 †Holcoptera
 †Holcoptera giebeli
 †Hoplichnus – type locality for genus
 †Hoplichnus equus – type locality for species
 †Hoplichnus quadrupedans – type locality for species
 †Hyphepus – type locality for genus
 †Hyphepus fieldi – type locality for species

I

 †Isocampe – type locality for genus
 †Isocampe strata – type locality for species

K

 †Kayentapus
 †Kayentapus minor – type locality for species

L

 †Lagunculapes – type locality for genus
 †Lagunculapes latus – type locality for species
 †Lunula
 †Lunula obscura

M

 †Mormolucoides – type locality for genus
 †Mormolucoides articulatus – type locality for species

O

 †Ornithichnites – type locality for genus
 †Ornithichnites giganteus – type locality for species
 †Ornithoidichnites
 †Ornithoidichnites cuneatus – type locality for species
 †Ornithoidichnites giganteus
 †Ornithoidichnites lyellii – type locality for species
 †Ornithopus
 †Ornithopus adamsanus – type locality for species
 †Otouphepus
 †Otouphepus minor – type locality for species
  †Otozoum – type locality for genus
 †Otozoum minus – type locality for species
 †Otozoum moodii – type locality for species

P

 †Palaephemera
 †Palaephemera mediaeva
 †Palamopus
 †Palamopus divaricans
 †Paxillitriletes
 †Paxillitriletes dakotaensis
 †Pityostrobus
 †Pityostrobus kayei – type locality for species
 †Platypterna
 †Platypterna concamerata – type locality for species
 †Platypterna deanii
 †Platypterna digitigrada – type locality for species
 †Platypterna gracillima – type locality for species
 †Platypterna recta – type locality for species
 †Platypterna varica – type locality for species
 †Plectropterna
 †Plectropterna gracilis – type locality for species
 †Plectropterna lineans
 †Plectropterna minitans
 †Plesiornis – type locality for genus
 †Plesiornis pilulatus – type locality for species
   †Podokesaurus – type locality for genus
 †Podokesaurus holyokensis – type locality for species
 †Polemarchus – type locality for genus
 †Polemarchus gigas – type locality for species
 †Pseudoaraucaria
 †Pseudoaraucaria arnoldii – type locality for species
 †Pterichnus
 †Pterichnus centipes
 †Ptilichnus – type locality for genus
 †Ptilichnus anomalus – type locality for species
 †Ptilichnus hydrodromus – type locality for species
 †Ptilichnus pectinatus – type locality for species
 †Ptilichnus typographus – type locality for species

S

 †Sagittarius
 †Sagittarius alternans
 †Saltator
 †Saltator bipedatus – type locality for species
 †Saltator caudatus – type locality for species
 †Sauropus
 †Sauropus barrattii – type locality for species
 †Selenichnus
 †Selenichnus breviusculus – type locality for species
 †Selenichnus falcatus – type locality for species
 †Sillimanius
 †Sillimanius gracilior
 †Sillimanius tetradactylus
  †Skolithos
 †Sphaerapus
 †Sphaerapus larvalis
 †Sphaerapus magnus
 †Stegomus
 †Stegomus longipes – type locality for species
 †Stenonyx
 †Stenonyx lateralis – type locality for species
 †Steropezoum
 †Steropezoum elegantius
 †Steropoides
 †Steropoides divaricatus – type locality for species
 †Steropoides diversus – type locality for species
 †Steropoides elegans – type locality for species
 †Steropoides infelix – type locality for species
 †Steropoides ingens – type locality for species
 †Steropoides loripes – type locality for species
 †Steropoides uncus – type locality for species
 †Stratipes – type locality for genus
 †Stratipes latus – type locality for species

T

 †Tarsodactylus – type locality for genus
 †Tarsodactylus caudatus – type locality for species
 †Tarsodactylus expansus – type locality for species
 †Tarsoplectrus
 †Tarsoplectrus angustus – type locality for species
 †Toxichnus – type locality for genus
 †Toxichnus inaequalis – type locality for species
 †Triaenopus
 †Triaenopus baileyanus
 †Trihamus – type locality for genus
 †Trihamus elegans – type locality for species
 Trisulcus
 †Trisulcus laqueatus
 †Typopus – type locality for genus
 †Typopus abnormis – type locality for species

X

 †Xiphopeza – type locality for genus
 †Xiphopeza triplex – type locality for species

Cenozoic
This list of the Cenozoic life of Massachusetts contains the various prehistoric life-forms whose fossilized remains have been reported from within the US state of Massachusetts and are between 66 million and 10,000 years of age.

List

A

 Aligena
 †Aligena elevata
 Anadara
  †Anadara transversa
 Angulus
 †Angulus agilis
 Anomia
 †Anomia paucistriata
 †Anomia simplexiformis
 Astarte
 †Astarte castanea
 †Astarte crenata
 †Astarte undata
 Astyris
 †Astyris lunata

B

  Balaenoptera
 †Balaenoptera sursiplana – tentative report
 Balanus
 †Balanus crenatus
 Boonea
 †Boonea impressa
 Brachidontes
 †Brachidontes vineyardensis
 Buccinum
 †Buccinum undatum

C

 Callinectes
  †Callinectes sapidus
 †Callophoca
 †Callophoca obscura
 Cardium
 Caryocorbula
 †Caryocorbula contracta
 Cliona
 †Cliona sulphurea
  Colus
 †Colus stimpsoni
 Corymbites
 †Corymbites aethiops
 Crassostrea
 †Crassostrea virginica
 Crenella
 †Crenella glandula
 Crepidula
 †Crepidula fornicata
 †Crepidula plana
 Cumingia
 †Cumingia tellinoides
 †Cuneocorbula
 †Cuneocorbula whitfieldi
 Cyclocardia
 †Cyclocardia borealis
 †Cyclocardia novangliae
  Cymindis
 †Cymindis extorpescens – type locality for species

D

  Donacia
 †Donacia elongatula – type locality for species

E

  Ensis
 †Ensis directus
 Eontia
 †Eontia ponderosa
 Equus
 Eupleura
 †Eupleura caudata

G

 Gemma
 †Gemma gemma
  Glycymeris
 †Glycymeris wrigleyi – or unidentified related form

H

 Hemimactra
 †Hemimactra solidissima

I

 Ilyanassa
 †Ilyanassa obsoleta
 †Ilyanassa trivittata
 Ischadium
  †Ischadium recurvum

M

 Macoma
 †Macoma balthica
 †Mammut
  †Mammut americanum
  †Mammuthus
 Mercenaria
 †Mercenaria campechiensis
 †Mercenaria mercenaria
 Mesodesma
 †Mesodesma arctatum
 Modiolus
 †Modiolus hollicki
 †Monotherium
 †Monotherium aberratum
 †Mya
 †Mya arenaria
 †Mya truncata
 Mytilus
 †Mytilus edulis

N

  Neverita
 †Neverita duplicatus
 Nucula
 †Nucula potomacensis – or unidentified related form

O

  Odobenus
 Odostomia
 †Odostomia crenulata
 †Odostomia semicostata
 Ostrea

P

 Panomya
 †Panomya norvegica
 Panopeus
 †Panopeus herbstii
 Petricola
 †Petricola pholadiformis
 †Pinguinus
  †Pinguinus impennis
 Placopecten
 †Placopecten magellanicus
 †Prophoca – or unidentified comparable form
 †Prophoca rousseaui

S

 †Saxinis
 †Saxinis regularis – type locality for species
 Serpula
 †Serpula dianthus
  †Squalodon
 †Squalodon atlanticus

T

  Tellina
 Terebra
 †Terebra juvenicostata
 Turbonilla
 †Turbonilla interrupta
 Turritella

U

 Urosalpinx
  †Urosalpinx cinerea

References
 

Massachusetts